Macrosolen is a genus of plants in the family Loranthaceae. It includes about 83 species all over the world with ca. 40 species widely distributed in tropical South and Southeast Asia. Some species were described by de Loureiro (1790, as Loranthus), Lecomte (1915, as Elytranthe), Danser (1938) and Hô (2003).

Description 

Macrosolen are parasitic shrubs.

Taxonomy 
The genus was described by Carl Ludwig Blume and published in Systema Vegetabilium 7(2): 1731. 1830. (Oct.-Dec. 1830)

History

Species 

 Macrosolen acunae Danser
 Macrosolen albicaulis Wiens
 Macrosolen amboinensis Danser
 Macrosolen ampullaceus Blume
 Macrosolen ampullaceus (Roxb.) Tiegh.
 Macrosolen angulatus Danser
 Macrosolen annamicus Danser
 Macrosolen avenis Danser
 Macrosolen barlowii Wiens
 Macrosolen beccarii Tiegh. ex Becc.
 Macrosolen bellus Danser
 Macrosolen bibracteolatus (Hance) Danser
 Macrosolen bidoupensis (Shuichiro Tagane, Van Son Dang, Nguyen Van Ngoc, Hoang Thi Binh, Natsuki Komada, Jarearnsak Sae Wai, Akiyo Naiki, Hidetoshi Nagamasu, Hironori Toyama, Tetsukazu Yahara) 2017
 Macrosolen borneanus Danser
 Macrosolen brandisianus (Kurz) Tiegh.
 Macrosolen brevitubus Barlow
 Macrosolen capitellatus (Wight & Arn.) Danser
 Macrosolen carinatulus (Wall.) Tiegh.
 Macrosolen clavatus Blume
 Macrosolen cochinchinensis (Lour.) Tiegh.
 Macrosolen coriaceus Danser
 Macrosolen crassus Danser
 Macrosolen creatophyllus Miq.
 Macrosolen curtiflorus Danser
 Macrosolen curvinervis Danser
 Macrosolen demesae Danser
 Macrosolen dianthus Danser
 Macrosolen elasticus Blume
 Macrosolen evenius Miq.
 Macrosolen flammeus Danser
 Macrosolen floridus Danser
 Macrosolen fordii (Hance) Danser
 Macrosolen formosus (Blume) Miq. [Unplaced]
 Macrosolen geminatus (Merr.) Danser
 Macrosolen globosus (Roxb.) Tiegh.
 Macrosolen jackianus Miq.
 Macrosolen javanus Danser
 Macrosolen krempfii Danser
 Macrosolen kunstleri (King) Tiegh.
 Macrosolen latifolius Danser
 Macrosolen lowii (King) Tiegh.
 Macrosolen macgregorii Danser
 Macrosolen macrophyllus Miq.
 Macrosolen melintangensis Miq.
 Macrosolen nobilis Danser
 Macrosolen oleoides Miq.
 Macrosolen pallens Miq.
 Macrosolen papillosus Danser
 Macrosolen parasiticus (L.) Danser
 Macrosolen patulus Blume
 Macrosolen patulus (Jack) Miq.
 Macrosolen platyphyllus Danser
 Macrosolen pseudoglobosus Miq.
 Macrosolen pseudoperfoliatus Miq.
 Macrosolen psilanthus (Hook.f.) Danser
 Macrosolen pusillus Danser
 Macrosolen reinwardtianus Blume
 Macrosolen retusus Blume
 Macrosolen retusus Miq.
 Macrosolen robinsonii (Gamble) Danser
 Macrosolen rotundatus Miq.
 Macrosolen sphaerocarpus (Blume) Miq.
 Macrosolen sphaerocarpus Blume
 Macrosolen splendidus Danser
 Macrosolen suberosus (Lauterb.) Danser
 Macrosolen subsessilis Danser
 Macrosolen subumbellatus Blume
 Macrosolen subumbellatus (Blume) Tiegh.
 Macrosolen sumatranus Danser
 Macrosolen surigaoensis Danser
 Macrosolen tenuiflorus Danser
 Macrosolen tetragonus Blume
 Macrosolen tetragonus (Blume) Miq.
 Macrosolen tomentosus Blume
 Macrosolen tribracteatus Danser
 Macrosolen tricolor (Lecomte) Danser
 Macrosolen trigonus (Wight & Arn.) Tiegh.
 Macrosolen tubiflorus (Ridl.) Danser
 Macrosolen urceolatus Danser
 Macrosolen viridiflorus (Wall.) Tiegh.
 Macrosolen viridiflorus Blume
 Macrosolen worcesteri Danser
 Macrosolen wrayi Danser

Distribution and status

References

External links
 
 GBIF: Macrosolen
 
 Macrosolen (Blume) Rchb.
  2018. The parasitic plant connection websiteː Loranthaceae. Accessed 20 February 2018

Loranthaceae
Loranthaceae genera